In Greek mythology, Xanthippe (Ancient Greek: Ξανθίππη "yellow horse" derived from ξανθος xanthos "yellow" and ‘ιππος hippos "horse") is a name that may refer to:

 Xanthippe, daughter of Dorus, son of Apollo and Phthia. She was the wife of King Pleuron and mother by him of Agenor, Sterope, Stratonice and Laophonte.
 Xanthippe, daughter of Myconus. She fed her imprisoned father with her own breastmilk to prevent him from dying of starvation. She is also known as Pero.
 Xanthippe, an Amazon who is depicted confronting Iolaus on a red-figure vase painting.

Notes

References 

 Apollodorus, The Library with an English Translation by Sir James George Frazer, F.B.A., F.R.S. in 2 Volumes, Cambridge, MA, Harvard University Press; London, William Heinemann Ltd. 1921. ISBN 0-674-99135-4. Online version at the Perseus Digital Library. Greek text available from the same website.
Gaius Julius Hyginus, Fabulae from The Myths of Hyginus translated and edited by Mary Grant. University of Kansas Publications in Humanistic Studies. Online version at the Topos Text Project.

Amazons (Greek mythology)
Aetolian characters in Greek mythology